The 2001 World Table Tennis Championships were held in Osaka from April 23 to May 6, 2001. It was the last time that the Championships hosted both the individual and team events.

Results

Team

Individual

References

External links
ITTF Museum

 
World Table Tennis Championships
World Table Tennis Championships
World Table Tennis Championships
Table tennis competitions in Japan
Table
April 2001 sports events in Asia
Sports competitions in Osaka
21st century in Osaka
May 2001 sports events in Asia